Elisabeth Boyko (24 September 1892 - 14 December 1985) was an Austrian-Israeli botanist noted for pioneering the use of salt water for irrigation of desert plants in Israel, alongside her husband Hugo Boyko.  She received the William F. Petersen Award from the International Society of Biometeorology.

Selected works

References 

1892 births
1985 deaths
Israeli women scientists
Israeli botanists